Lithocarpus conocarpus is a tree in the beech family Fagaceae. The specific epithet  is from the Greek meaning "cone fruit", referring to the acorn shape.

Description
The greyish brown bark is scaly.

Distribution and habitat
Lithocarpus conocarpus grows naturally in Sumatra, Peninsular Malaysia, Singapore, Java and Borneo. Its habitat is lowland to lower montane forests up to  altitude.

Uses
The timber is used locally in home construction.

References

conocarpus
Trees of Sumatra
Trees of Malaya
Trees of Java
Trees of Borneo
Plants described in 1861